Judson Swain Siler (June 14, 1863 – June 7, 1942) was an American politician who served in the Washington House of Representatives from 1913 to 1921 and 1923 to 1929.

References

Republican Party members of the Washington House of Representatives
1863 births
1942 deaths